Schwenningen is a municipality in the district of Sigmaringen in Baden-Württemberg in Germany close to the Heuberg Military Training Area.

Mayors

 1972–1988: Peter Allgaier
 1992–2016: Herbert Bucher (FWV)
 since 2016: Roswitha Beck

References

Sigmaringen (district)
Baden